St John Paul II Catholic School may mean the following schools named in honour of Saint John Paul II:

In Australia
St John Paul II Catholic College, in Sydney, New South Wales

In Canada
 St. John Paul II Catholic Secondary School, in Toronto, Ontario

In the United States
 St. John Paul II Catholic High School (Alabama)
 St. John Paul II Catholic High School (Arizona)
 St. John Paul II Catholic High School (Florida)
 St. John Paul II High School (Massachusetts)
 St. John Paul II High School (Corpus Christi, Texas)
 Saint John Paul the Great Catholic High School, in Potomac Shores, Virginia

See also
Other schools
 John Paul II High School, Greymouth, New Zealand
 John Paul II Catholic High School (North Carolina)
 John Paul II High School (Plano, Texas)
 John Paul II Catholic High School (Schertz, Texas)
 John Paul II High School in Tarnów, Poland
 Pope John Paul II College of Education
 Pope John Paul II High School (Tennessee)
 Pope John Paul II High School (Pennsylvania)
 Pope John Paul II Catholic High School (Louisiana)
 Pope John Paul II High School (Washington)

Universities and Colleges
 John Paul II Catholic University of Lublin
 John Paul II Institute
 John Paul II Minor Seminary
 John Paul the Great Catholic University
 Pontifical University of John Paul II
 Pope John Paul II College of Education

 *